The 2016–17 TCR Thailand Touring Car Championship is the first season of the TCR Thailand Touring Car Championship. The championship will run within the Thailand Super Series' events.

Teams and drivers

Calendar and results
The 2016 schedule was announced in February 2016.

Drivers' championship
Only the best 8 results counted for the final classification.

Notes:
† – Drivers did not finish the race, but were classified as they completed over 75% of the race distance.

Notes

References

External links
 

2016 in motorsport
Thailand Touring Car Championship
TCR
Thailand Touring Car Championship
TCR